The 2015 Africa Magic Viewers Choice Awards (AMVCA) was held on March 7, 2015 at the Eko Hotel and Suites, Victoria Island, Lagos, Nigeria. IK and Vimbai were the hosts of the event.  A new category, Best Indigenous Language (Igbo), was introduced in the 2015 awards.

References

Entertainment events in Nigeria
2015 in Nigerian cinema
Africa Magic
21st century in Lagos
Africa Magic Viewers' Choice Awards ceremonies